While You Were Sleeping is a compilation album by Canadian rapper Classified. It contains both previous and unreleased tracks, including demo tracks, singles, as well as new material.

Track listing
"This Is For"  – 3:21
"Love the One You're With" (Ft. Mic Boyd, Mike Boyd Sr.)  – 3:47
"Hold Your Own"  – 3:17
"Fall From Paradise"  – 4:14
"Unpredictable" – 3:48
"Flash Backs"  – 2:59
"Ain't Hard to Find" (Ft. Jordan Croucher & Mic Boyd) – 3:46
"Life's a Bitch"  – 2:45
"The Maritimes"  – 3:03
"It Ain't Over"  – 3:03
"It's Sickenin'" (Ft. Mic Boyd)  – 3:33
"Now Whut"  - 3:09
"Can't Stop" (Ft. Chino XL & Quake)  - 4:13
"Politics"  - 3:06
"Addicted"  - 3:40
"Beatin' It"  - 3:59
"Heavy Artillery"  - 3:32
"Shit Can Be Shit"  - 3:05
"Past Out"  - 2:56
"My Life" - 2:44
"Talking Shit" - 2:56
"Hard to Be Hip Hop" (Ft. Maestro Fresh Wes)" - 3:15

References

Classified (rapper) albums
2007 compilation albums